Piculus is a genus of birds in the woodpecker family Picidae that are found in Central and South America.

Taxonomy
The genus was introduced by the German naturalist Johann Baptist von Spix in 1824. The type species was subsequently designated as the golden-green woodpecker (Piculus chrysochloros) by the American ornithologist Harry C. Oberholser in 1923. The generic name is a diminutive of the Latin word Picus meaning "woodpecker".

The genus forms part of the woodpecker subfamily Picinae and has a sister relationship to the genus Dryocopus whose species are found in Eurasia and the Americas. The genus Piculus is a member of  the tribe Picini and belongs to a clade that contains five genera: Colaptes, Piculus, Mulleripicus, Dryocopus and Celeus.

The genus contains seven species:

Five other species, formerly placed here, are now in Colaptes.

References

 
Bird genera

Higher-level bird taxa restricted to the Neotropics
Taxonomy articles created by Polbot